Trstenik is a settlement in the Municipality of Šentrupert in southeastern Slovenia. It lies just northeast of Mirna in the historical region of Lower Carniola. The municipality is now included in the Southeast Slovenia Statistical Region. It includes the hamlets of Butara, Gorenji Konec, Veliki Konec, Kurja Dolina, Dolenji Konec, Kot, and Sotlo.

References

External links
Trstenik at Geopedia

Populated places in the Municipality of Šentrupert